I Love Money is an American reality television series that aired on VH1 and was produced by 51 Minds Entertainment, a subsidiary of Endemol, and was a spin-off of Flavor of Love, Charm School, I Love New York, Rock of Love, Real Chance of Love, For the Love of Ray J, Daisy of Love and Megan Wants a Millionaire. Contestants on these shows competed in physical and mental challenges, aiming for a $250,000 grand prize. Created by executive producers Cris Abrego and Mark Cronin.
The contestants of the first two seasons were located in Huatulco, Mexico for the duration of their time on the show, while the third and fourth season contestants were located in Manzanillo, Mexico.

Airing of the show

Season one

In the first season, the contestants were selected from the first two seasons of Flavor of Love, Rock of Love and I Love New York and competed in physical and mental challenges in an attempt to win $250,000. Production started in early February 2008, and concluded in March 2008. The show premiered on July 6, 2008 and the casting special aired on July 1. The show is hosted by Craig J. Jackson. The winner was Nicole Alexander better known as "Hoopz".

Season two

In the second season, the contestants were selected from the shows Flavor of Love, Rock of Love, I Love New York, and Real Chance of Love and are competing in physical and mental challenges in an attempt to win $250,000. Production started in late October 2008, and concluded in November 2008. The show premiered on February 2, 2009, with Craig J. Jackson returning as host. The winner was Angela "Myammee" Pitts.

Season three: Ryan Jenkins

I Love Money 3 would have been a follow-up to the previous seasons of the show. The contestants were to be selected from other VH1 reality shows such as Flavor of Love, Rock of Love, I Love New York, Real Chance of Love, For the Love of Ray J, Daisy of Love, and Megan Wants a Millionaire. Production began in late June 2009 and wrapped early August 2009, with Craig J. Jackson returning to host. Ryan Alexander Jenkins was the winner.

Reportedly, I Love Money 3 was set to air in January 2010. In August 2009, VH1 canceled any showings of season three due to castmember Ryan Jenkins's involvement in the murder of Jasmine Fiore, as well as Jenkins's suicide. It had been revealed that Jenkins had been convicted for assault in 2007, but this had not been disclosed to VH1 or 51 Minds.

The girls who competed were Deelishis and Buckeey from Flavor of Love, Lacey Conner and Marcia "Brazil' Alves from Rock of Love, Bubbles from Real Chance of Love and Lil Hood, Cashmere, and Cocktail from For the Love of Ray J. The boys who competed were Wolf and Pretty from I Love New York, Fox, Sinister, Weasel, Big Rig, and Professor from Daisy of Love, and Joe Pascolla and Ryan Jenkins from Megan Wants a Millionaire.  As of 2023, the third season remains unreleased.

On May 9, 2020, Lil Hood, Weasel, Big Rig, and Joe participated in a one-time tell-all on YouTube. Lil Hood stated in the intro that the cast would not mention Jenkins or Jasmine Fiore; rather, they would just focus on what happened in the show.

On November 23, 2020, Cocktail made a guest appearance on Lacey's Talk of Love Podcast to talk about everything she remembered from her time on the show.

Season four

I Love Money 4 had been announced as the follow-up to I Love Money 3. In April 2010, it was confirmed by VH1 executive vice president Jeff Olde that neither season would air. Despite earlier indicating that the season would not air, it was later reported that the season had been placed into a late night time slot in September 2010, though viewer demand encouraged VH1 to later move the episode premiere to a prime time Wednesday time slot. The contestants were selected from the shows Rock of Love, I Love New York, Real Chance of Love, For the Love of Ray J, Daisy of Love, and Megan Wants a Millionaire.  They competed in physical and mental challenges in an attempt to win $250,000. The show premiered on September 16, 2010 with Craig J. Jackson as the host. The winner was Rock of Love's Mindy Hall.

References

External links
 

VH1 original programming
2000s American reality television series
2010s American reality television series
Reality television spin-offs
2008 American television series debuts
2010 American television series endings
English-language television shows
Television shows set in Mexico
Television series by Endemol
Television series by 51 Minds Entertainment
American television spin-offs